Rasmusson is a surname of German and Swedish origin, or an Americanized spelling of Rasmussen. Notable people with the surname include:

Birger Axel Rasmusson (1901–1964), Finnish chess player
Hal Rasmusson (1900–1962), American cartoonist
Mikael Rasmusson (born 1967), Swedish footballer
Roland Rasmusson, Swedish footballer

References

Surnames of German origin
Surnames of Swedish origin